"Boogie Wonderland" is a song by American band Earth, Wind & Fire with The Emotions, released in April 1979 on Columbia Records as the first single from their ninth album, I Am (1979). The song peaked at number 14 on the US Billboard dance chart, number six on the Billboard Hot 100, and number two on the Billboard Hot Soul Singles chart. It was certified Gold in the US by the RIAA and Gold in the UK by the BPI. "Boogie Wonderland" was Grammy nominated in the categories of Best R&B Instrumental Performance and Best Disco Recording.

Overview
The song was composed by Allee Willis with Jon Lind and produced by EWF leader Maurice White and Al McKay.

Critical reception
Rose Riggins of Gannett wrote "Boogie Wonderland is the hit. But it is more than just an average pop song. The song is an exploration is of times spent at house parties and at discos, when you wanted to be disco queen or king and the spotlight just wouldn't focus on you. You wonder why and look into the mirror and it says, Uh, Uh, baby it don't work you dance to shake the hurt. Like so many of EWFs hits, Boogie Wonderland, is bolstered by the blazing horns that have become the groups trademark. Teamed up with the talented vocal group the Emotions, EWF has created a song that will join the ranks of such past hits as Mighty Mighty, Getaway, Fantasy and September." Dave Marsh of Rolling Stone said Maurice White "takes simple dance formulas like 'Boogie Wonderland' and finds fresh possibilities within them."  

Record World called it a "sophisticated ultra-modern disco tune spiced by The Emotions' vocals."  Matthew Greenwald of AllMusic stated "one of the few records that paired two full-fledged groups successfully, the combination of EWF and the Emotions worked wonders here and it remains a classic of the period." Allen Weiner of Morning Call wrote "Boogie Wonderland is the LP's most commercial tune, a tribute to both jazz/soul and disco fans that is pulsating and pleasing." Ace Adams of the New York Daily News also found that "The Emotions' Boogie Wonderland gets Earth, Wind & Fire off to a flying start on this album".  Cash Box called it a "a standout pop dance track," saying that "sharp, slamming horn intro segues into bright backup singing by the Emotions, blending in perfectly with E, W & F leader Maurice White's vocal."

Covers
 "Boogie Wonderland" was the basis for the dance song "I'm Alive" by Stretch & Vern present "Maddog"; the song reached number six in the UK in September 1996.

Appearances in other media
 "Boogie Wonderland" has been featured in the American films Roller Boogie,  Skatetown USA, Madagascar, Happy Feet, Don't Look Under the Bed, Billy & Mandy's Big Boogey Adventure, The Mirror Has Two Faces, Caddyshack and The Nice Guys, as well as the French films The Intouchables and Disco.
 It was in the Season 9 episode A.A.R.M of U.S. TV series The Office.
 A remix of the song was used in the arcade game Dance Dance Revolution 3rdMIX, and the original version appeared later in Hottest Party 3.
 The song is used in the Australian play, Priscilla: the Musical.
 The song appeared in the video games, Rabbids Go Home and Just Dance 3.
 The song is used as the theme for Pro Wrestling Noah wrestler Muhammad Yone.

Charts

Weekly charts

Year-end charts

Personnel
 Maurice White - lead and background vocals, drums, kalimba
 Philip Bailey - background vocals, congas, percussion
 Verdine White - bass
 Ralph Johnson - percussion
 Al McKay & Marlo Henderson - guitar 
 Larry Dunn - Piano & Oberheim and Moog Synthesizers
 Fred White - drums
 Don Myrick - alto, tenor, and baritone Saxophones
 The Emotions - backing vocals
 Daniel Smith, Delores Bing, Jacqueline Lustgarten, Jan Kelley, John Walz, Kevan Torfeh, Larry Corbett, Miguel Martinez - cello
 Barbara Korn, Sidney Muldrow, Richard Perissi, Marilyn Robinson - french horn
 George Bohanon, Garnett Brown, Bill Reichenbach Jr., Louis Satterfield, Benjamin Powell, Maurice Spears - trombone
 Johnny Graham - guitar 
 Fred Jackson, Jr., Herman Riley, Jerome Richardson - Additional Saxophones
 Richard Lepore - Timpani
 Oscar Brashear, Bobby Bryant, Michael Harris, Jerry Hey, Elmer Brown, Rahmlee Michael Davis, Steve Madaio - trumpets
 James Ross, Laurie Woods, Linda Lipsett, Marilyn Baker, Rollice Dale, Virginia Majewski - viola
 Anton Sen, Sherman Bryana, Carl LaMagna, Cynthia Kovaks, Gina Kronstadt, Haim Shtrum, Harris Goldman, Henry Ferber, Henry Roth, Ilkka Talvi, Jack Gootkin, Jerome Reisler, Jerome Webster, Joseph Goodman, Joseph Livoti, Judith Talvi, Leeana Sherman, Marcy Dicterow, Pamela Gates, Pavel Farkas, Ronald Clarck, Rosmen Torfeh, Sheldon Sanov, William Henderson - violin
 Steve Poskitt - step in drummer for Boogie Wonderland recording

Certifications

Accolades
The information regarding accolades attributed to "Boogie Wonderland" is adapted from AcclaimedMusic.net.

(*) designates lists that are unordered.

References

Earth, Wind & Fire songs
The Emotions songs
1979 songs
1979 singles
Songs written by Allee Willis
Songs written by Jon Lind
Columbia Records singles
Songs about dancing
Disco songs
Vocal collaborations
Song recordings produced by Maurice White